Nainital Legislative Assembly constituency is one of the seventy electoral Uttarakhand Legislative Assembly constituencies of Uttarakhand state in India. It includes Nainital area of Nainital District.

Nainital Legislative Assembly constituency is a part of Nainital-Udhamsingh Nagar (Lok Sabha constituency).

Members of Legislative Assembly

Election results

2022

Notes

References
 http://www.empoweringindia.org/new/searching.aspx?value=nainital&type=2

External link
  

Nainital
Assembly constituencies of Uttarakhand
2002 establishments in Uttarakhand
Constituencies established in 2002